The Northumberland Strategic Partnership was the Local Strategic Partnership for the county of Northumberland created in 1997.  As of 2015 the partnership is not active.

References

Northumberland